Future Listening! is the debut studio album by Japanese music producer Towa Tei, released on October 21, 1994 by For Life Music. It is Tei's first release after his departure from Deee-Lite. The album was released in the United States on April 25, 1995 by Elektra Records.

Produced by Tei, Future Listening! includes collaborations with artists such as Joi Cardwell, Bebel Gilberto, Arto Lindsay, MC Kinky, Hiroshi Takano, Ryuichi Sakamoto, Haruomi Hosono, Toshihiko Mori, Satoshi Tomiie, Yuichi Oki of Tokyo Ska Paradise Orchestra, and Pizzicato Five vocalist Maki Nomiya. The album peaked at number 50 on the Oricon Albums Chart. Both "Luv Connection" (featuring Cardwell on vocals) and "Technova" (remixed by Josh Wink) were top 30 hits on the US Hot Dance Club Play chart in 1995.

In 2007, Rolling Stone Japan placed Future Listening! at number 59 on its list of the "100 Greatest Japanese Rock Albums of All Time". The 2007 reissue of the album peaked at number 73 on the Oricon Albums Chart.

Track listing

Charts

References

External links
 

1994 debut albums
Towa Tei albums
Albums recorded at Chung King Studios
Elektra Records albums